The pineapple is a tropical plant, and also refers to the edible fruit it bears.

Pineapple may also refer to:

Music
"Pineapple" (Ty Dolla Sign song), 2018
Pineapple (Karol G song), 2018
"Pineapple", a song by Jah Wobble from The Legend Lives On... Jah Wobble in "Betrayal", 1980
"Pineapple", a song by Karol G from Ocean, 2019
"Pineapple", a song by New World Sound, 2014
"Pineapple", a song by Sparks from Indiscreet, 1975

Other uses
 The Pineapple, a folly building in Scotland
 Pineapple grenade, nickname for the U.S. Mk 2 hand grenade
 Pineapple, a 2008 film featuring Skye McCole Bartusiak
 A community card variation of poker
 A member of the Pi Alpha Phi fraternity
 A nickname for the Our Gang character played by Eugene Jackson

See also
 
 Anana (disambiguation)
 Pine (disambiguation)
 Apple (disambiguation)